Corkey or Corky is a small village in County Antrim, Northern Ireland. Located 11 miles east of Ballymoney, it is within the Ballymoney Borough Council area, and is at the edge of the Glens of Antrim. The villages of Loughguile and Cloughmills are nearby. It had a population of 202 people (59 households) in the 2011 Census.

The Scottish renewable energy company Scottish Power Renewables operate a ten-windmill wind farm in Corkey. The wind farm is on Slievenahanagh mountain. Local company W & J Taggart own and run Corkey quarry, supplying stones to local building contractors.

Altnahinch Dam and Slieveanorra Forest are outside Corkey.

The local school is St Anne's Primary School.

See also
List of towns and villages in Northern Ireland

References

External links
 St Anne's PS Corkey

Villages in County Antrim